Presidential elections were held in the Republic of Serbia in December 1997, following the annulment of the results of the September–October elections due to low voter turnout. The result was a victory for Milan Milutinović of the Socialist Party of Serbia, who defeated Vojislav Šešelj in the second round.

Results

References

Pres
1997 12
Elections in Serbia and Montenegro
Serbia